Bhat De is a Bangladeshi film, released in 1984. The film was edited, written and directed by Amjad Hossain. The film starred Alamgir, Shabana in the lead roles and co-starred Wasimul Bari Rajib, Anwar Hossain and more.

Cast 
 Alamgir
 Shabana – Jori
 Wasimul Bari Rajib
Anwar Hossain
 Anwara
 Akhi Alamgir – child actor

Crew 
 Producer – Abu Zafar Khan
 Director – Amjad Hossain
 Screenplay – Amjad Hossain
 Image Editor – Mujibur Rahman Dulu
 Art Directors – Anjan Bhowmik
 Sound – MA Baset
 Music – Alauddin Ali

Accolades

National Film Awards 

In 1984 the film Bhalt De has got best film award and including total 9 awards.
 Won Best Actress –  Shabana 1984
 Won Best child actor – Akhi Alamgir 1984
 Won Best Director: Amjad Hossain 1984
 Won Best Producer: Abu Jafar Khan 1984
 Won Best Screenwriter Abu Zafar Khan 1984
 Won Best dialogue writer Abu Zafar Khan 1984
 Won Best sound customer MA Baset, 1984
 Won Best Image Editor Mujibur Rahman Dulu 1984
 Won Best Art Instruction Anjan Bhowmik, 1984

International awards 
The Bengali film Bhat De was the part of the Cannes International Film Festival.

Music

Soundtrack

See also
 Rani Kuthir Baki Itihash
 Biyer Phul

References

1984 films
1984 drama films
Bengali-language Bangladeshi films
Bangladeshi drama films
Best Film National Film Award (Bangladesh) winners
Films scored by Amjad Hossain
Films scored by Alauddin Ali
1980s Bengali-language films
Films directed by Amjad Hossain
Films whose writer won the Best Screenplay National Film Award (Bangladesh)